East Bergholt is a village in the Babergh District of Suffolk, England, just north of the Essex border.

The nearest town and railway station is Manningtree, Essex. Schools include East Bergholt High School, a comprehensive for children aged 11–16, and a primary school.

During the 16th century, its inhabitants became well known for Protestant radicalism.  A few of its citizens were martyred during the reign of Queen Mary I, and the Protestant martyrologist John Foxe recorded their stories in his famous work Acts and Monuments (also known as Foxe's Book of Martyrs).

East Bergholt is the birthplace of painter John Constable whose father owned Flatford Mill. Flatford and Dedham, Essex, both made famous by John Constable, are within walking distance of East Bergholt.

St Mary's Church and bell cage
The Church of St Mary the Virgin was built in the 15th and 16th centuries, but is well known for the absence of a tower or spire to house the bells.  Work began on a tower in 1525, but Cardinal Wolsey's fall from grace in 1530 brought construction to a halt and the following year a wooden bell cage was erected in the churchyard.  The Bell Cage was built as a temporary structure to house the bells until the tower could be built. It still exists and now houses the set of 5 bells, although it is possible the tenor, which weighs 1 ton 6 cwt 0 qr 8 lb (1,320 kg) and has a diameter 4 ft 6 in (137 cm), was added in 1691. There are rumors the Bell Cage was moved from its original position in the 17th century because the occupant of Old Hall objected to the noise of the bells. The only evidence for this is a 1731 hand-drawn map on vellum that shows the Bell Cage situated to the East of the Church.

The bells are exceptional in that they are not rung from below by ropes attached to wheels, as is usual in change ringing, but the headstock is manipulated by hand by ringers standing beside the bells.

Other important buildings

Old Hall, with over 100 rooms and 355 windows has been in its time a manor house, nunnery, army barracks and friary. It now houses the Old Hall Community, a single household of about 60 people who live co-operatively and farm organically.
Stour House was once the home of Randolph Churchill.
East Bergholt Place, home of the Eley family and "The Place for Plants" garden centre is noted for camellias.
Lambe School, a Grade II listed building, now the village hall, was founded 1594 by Edward Lambe.
Bridge Cottage is a 16th-century cottage used as a location by John Constable.

Governance
The parish of East Bergholt is its own electoral ward as part of Babergh District council and is part of the Samford division of Suffolk County Council.
The village has its own parish council made up of 13 councillors. 
The village is twinned with the village of Barbizon in France.

Climate 

East Bergholt has a weather station for which data is available. The village experiences a maritime climate with a narrow range of temperature and rainfall spread evenly throughout the year. See Ipswich Climate data.

Amenities 
The village is the home of the East Bergholt Dramatic Society, which was probably formed some time during the 1960s. Lady Anne Wake-Walker was President of the Society for most of the time from its inception to the early 1990s. Her daughter Diana MacFarlane is the present President. The group, which has about 20 members, meets most Tuesdays and Thursdays at the Constable Memorial Hall, from 8pm to 10pm.

Housing development 
In 2014 plans were drawn up for a new 144 housing estate in the north of the village. Local residents responded by erecting multiple signs around the village campaigning for a "No" decision by Babergh District Council. In March 2016, Babergh District Council approved the plans for a new housing development, despite strong opposition from Action East Bergholt Group and many concerned residents.  As a result, in April 2017 residents were reported to be considering a fight to become part of neighbouring Essex county rather than the current county of Suffolk.

Despite earlier strong opposition to any large developments within East Bergholt, the parish council has given its support to a large quasi-commercial development within East End, East Bergholt. Thereby exposing itself to future large developments within the village.

Notable residents

References

External links

 
Villages in Suffolk
Civil parishes in Suffolk
Babergh District